The Witches and the Grinnygog is a British television serial that was first aired in 1983.  The story was adapted from the book The Witches and the Grinnygog by Dorothy Edwards and was aired as a six-part television serial produced by Television South for ITV and subsequently re-broadcast in the US, Canada, New Zealand, and Israel.

Summary

A strange statue (the Grinnygog), which fell off the back of a truck carrying stones of an old church for relocation, is discovered by a woman on her way home from the store.  The woman takes the statue home and gives it to her elderly father as a garden ornament.

The family who now has possession of the Grinnygog, in particular one small boy, begin to experience strange feelings of euphoria and a desire to participate in folk magic rituals.  At the same time, a nervous, "other-worldly" child begins to be seen around the town and appears lost and frightened. Meanwhile, three eccentric older women arrive in the town and appear to be searching for something.  They bring with them the "daughter" of one of the women, later revealed to be a mannequin, but which at one point appears to be walking by itself.

The story eventually reveals that the three women are witches from England's Seventeenth Century who escaped a witch-hunt by somehow slipping through time into the modern age. The Grinnygog, which was an image of the Horned God, had lain dormant until being removed from the church, when it summoned the witches to the present day. One of the witches is now looking for her daughter who was separated during a witch-burning held hundreds of years ago in the town. The daughter escaped by slipping through time, but only intermittently, and is now lost without her mother.

The presence of the witches, and their relationship to the Grinnygog, is eventually worked out by a group of children who investigate their town's local history and discover that the town must make amends for the ancient injustice of witch-burning. One clue is revealed through an old manuscript written by a town elder who apparently witnessed the witch-burning and wrote an account of the event in a journal: however, he died before revealing the final clue about the escaped witches. Another clue is the arrival of an African witch doctor, named Mr. Alabaster, who is seeking out the witches to help them. The story ends with the witches reunited with the daughter and taken away by Mr. Alabaster to someplace where they will be safe, along with the Grinnygog.

Production

The TV series was filmed in and around Titchfield and Bishop's Waltham, Hampshire.  It was adapted by Roy Russell and directed by Diarmuid Lawrence, with music by James Harpham. It was shown on Nickelodeon in the United States as part of the anthology series The Third Eye.

Cast

The Children

 Jimmy Firkettle - Paul Curtis
 Essie Firkettle - Zoe Loftin
 Dave Firkettle - Adam Woodyatt
 Colin Sogood - Giles Harper
 Nan Sogood - Heidi Mayo

The Witches

 Mrs. Ems - Sheila Grant
 Edie Possett - Anna Wing
 Miss Bendybones - Patricia Hayes
 Margaret "Daisy" Ems - Eva Griffith

The Adults

 Reverend Anthony Sogood - Robert Swann
 Granddad Adams - John Barrard
 Mrs. Firkettle - Jane Wood
 Twebele Alabaster - Olu Jacobs 
 Miss Possett - Anne Dyson

Other Characters

 Patrick Flanagan - Liam O'Callaghan
 Flanagan's mate - Gary Hailes
 Major Gilmour - Alan Rowe
 Old Peggy - George Malpas
 Mrs. Featherly - Hilda Fenemore
 News Interviewer - Carolyn Courage
 Shop Customer - Heather Tobias
 Bus Driver - Tariq Yunus

Availability

There has been no domestic commercial release of the series on any format in the UK. This is possibly due to ongoing rights issues after the production company, TVS, dropped out of the ITV network in 1992 and subsequently went through a number of take-overs. This problem affects the majority of the TVS programme archive as much of the original production paperwork and sales documentation has been lost during the intervening years and current owners, The Walt Disney Company, appear to have little or no interest in these programmes.

External links

Information about the television program

1983 British television series debuts
1983 British television series endings
1980s British children's television series
1980s British television miniseries
British children's fantasy television series
ITV children's television shows
British television shows based on children's books
British supernatural television shows
English-language television shows
1980s Nickelodeon original programming
Television shows produced by Television South (TVS)
Witchcraft in television